Salzburger Spitzl, at  above sea level is the 14th highest peak in the Pioneer Mountains of Idaho. The peak is located on the border of Sawtooth and Salmon-Challis National Forests as well as Blaine and Custer counties.

References 

Mountains of Idaho
Mountains of Blaine County, Idaho
Mountains of Custer County, Idaho
Salmon-Challis National Forest
Sawtooth National Forest